In the 1524 Siege of Edo, also known as the , the Hōjō, led by Hōjō Ujitsuna, besieged Edo castle,
which was held by Uesugi Tomooki. Though Edo has since become the Japanese metropolis of Tokyo, it was then a more or less insignificant fishing village in the Kantō region.

Eager to repel the attackers, Uesugi Tomooki led his warriors out of the castle to meet the Hōjō in battle at the Takanawa river crossing. However, Ujitsuna led his men around the Uesugi force and attacked them from the rear. Retreating back to his castle, Tomooki found that the commander of his garrison, Ōta Suketaka, had betrayed him and opened the gates to the Hōjō.

This battle would mark the beginning of a seventeen-year struggle between the Hōjō clans and Uesugi clans for dominance of the Kantō.

References

Turnbull, Stephen (2002). 'War in Japan: 1467-1615'. Oxford: Osprey Publishing.

Edo 1524
1524 in Japan
Conflicts in 1524
Edo 1524